"You'll Never Be Sorry" is a song co-written and recorded by American country music duo The Bellamy Brothers.  It was released in July 1989 as the second single from their Greatest Hits Volume III compilation album.  The song reached number 10 on the Billboard Hot Country Singles & Tracks chart.  It was written by David Bellamy, Howard Bellamy and Don Schlitz.

Chart performance

Year-end charts

References

1989 singles
The Bellamy Brothers songs
Songs written by Don Schlitz
Song recordings produced by Tony Brown (record producer)
MCA Records singles
Curb Records singles
Songs written by Howard Bellamy
Songs written by David Bellamy (singer)
1989 songs